Ægir (anglicised as Aegir; Old Norse 'sea'), Hlér (Old Norse 'sea'), or Gymir (Old Norse less clearly 'sea, engulfer'), is a jötunn and a personification of the sea in Norse mythology. In the Old Norse record, Ægir hosts the gods in his halls and is associated with brewing ale. Ægir is attested as married to a goddess, Rán, who also personifies the sea, and together the two produced daughters who personify waves, the Nine Daughters of Ægir and Rán, and  Ægir's son is Snær, personified snow. Ægir may also be the father of the beautiful jötunn Gerðr, wife of the god Freyr, or these may be two separate figures who share the same name (see below and Gymir (father of Gerðr)).

One of Ægir's names, Hlér, is the namesake of the island Læsø (Old Norse Hléysey 'Hlér's island') and perhaps also Lejre in Denmark. Scholars have long analyzed Ægir's role in the Old Norse corpus, and the concept of the figure has had some influence in modern popular culture.

Names 
The Old Norse name Ægir ('sea') may stem from a Proto-Germanic form *āgwi-jaz ('that of the river/water'), itself a derivative of the stem *ahwō- ('river'; cf. Gothic  'body of water, river', Old English ēa 'stream', Old High German aha 'river'). Richard Cleasby and Guðbrandur Vigfússon saw his name as deriving from an ancient Indo-European root. Linguist Guus Kroonen argues that the Germanic stem *ahwō- is probably of Proto-Indo-European (PIE) origin, as it may be cognate with Latin aqua (via a common form *h₂ekʷ-eh₂-), and ultimately descend from the PIE root *h₂ep- ('water'; cf. Sanskrit áp- 'water', Tocharian āp- 'water, river'). Linguist Michiel de Vaan notes that the connection between Proto-Germanic *ahwō- and Old Norse Ægir remains uncertain, and that *ahwō- and aqua, if cognates, may also be loanwords from a non-Indo-European language.

The name Ægir is identical to a noun for 'sea' in skaldic poetry, itself a base word in many kennings. For instance, a ship is described as "Ægir's horse" and the waves as the "daughters of Ægir".

Poetic kennings in both Hversu Noregr byggðist (How Norway Was Settled) and Skáldskaparmál (The Language of Poetry) treat Ægir and the sea-jötunn Hlér, who lives on the Hlésey ('Hlér island', modern Læsø), as the same figure.

The meaning of the Old Norse name Gymir is unclear. Proposed translations include 'the earthly' (from Old Norse gumi), 'the wintry one' (from gemla), or 'the protector', the 'engulfer' (from geyma). (For more on this topic, see discussion below)

Attestations 

Ægir is attested in a variety of Old Norse sources.

Sonatorrek
Ægir and Rán receive mention in the poem Sonatorrek attributed to 10th century Icelandic skald Egill Skallagrímsson. In the poem, Egill laments the death of his son Böðvar, who drowned at sea during a storm. In one difficult stanza, the skald expresses the pain of losing his son by invoking the image of slaying the personified sea, personified as Ægir (Old Norse ǫlsmið[r] 'ale-smith') and Rán (Ægis man 'Ægir's wife'):

The skald later references Ægir by way of the kenning 'Hlér's fire' (Hlés  viti), meaning gold.

Poetic Edda
In the Poetic Edda, Ægir receives mention in the eddic poems Grímnismál, Hymiskviða, Lokasenna, and in the prose section of Helgakviða Hundingsbana I. In Grímnismál, the disguised god Odin references Ægir's status as a renowned host among the gods:

'Fleeting visions I have now revealed before the victory-gods's sons,
now the wished-for protection will awaken;
to the all the Æsir it will become known,
on Ægir's benches,
at Ægir's feast.'

In Hymiskviða, Ægir plays a major role. In the poem, the gods have become thirsty after a successful hunt, and are keen to celebrate with drink. They "shook the twigs and looked at the augury" and "found that at Ægir's was an ample choice of cauldrons".  Odin goes to Ægir, who he finds sitting in good cheer, and tells him he shall "often prepare a feast for the Æsir". Referring to Ægir as a jötunn, the poem describes how, now annoyed, Ægir hatches a plan: He asks Thor to fetch a particular cauldron, and that with it he could brew ale for them all. The gods are unable to find a cauldron of a size big enough to meet Ægir's request until the god Týr recommends one he knows of far away, setting the stage for the events of the rest of the poem.

According to the prose introduction to Lokasenna, "Ægir, who is also called Gymir", was hosting a feast "with the great cauldron which has just been told about", which many of the gods and elves attended. The prose introduction describes the feast as featuring gold that shimmers like fire light and ale that serves itself, and that "it was a great place of peace". In attendance also were Ægir's servers, Fimafeng and Eldir. The gods praise the excellence of their service and, hearing this, Loki murders Fimafeng, enraging the gods, who chase them out to the woods before returning to drink.

In the poem that follows the prose introduction (and in accompanying prose), Loki returns to the hall and greets Eldir: He says that before Eldir steps forward, he should first tell him what the gods are discussing in the hall. Eldir says that they're discussing weaponry and war, and having nothing good to say about Loki. Loki says that he will enter Ægir's halls and have a look at the feast, and with him bring quarrel and strife. Eldir notifies Loki that if he enters and causes trouble, he can expect them to return it to him. Loki enters the hall and the gods see him and become silent.

In Helgakviða Hundingsbana I, a great wave is referred to as "Ægir's terrible daughter".

Prose Edda
Ægir receives numerous mentions in the Prose Edda book Skáldskaparmál, where he sits at a banquet and asks the skaldic god Bragi many questions, and Bragi responds with narratives about the gods. The section begins as follows:

Beyond this section of Skáldskaparmál, Ægir receives several other mentions in kennings. Section 25 provides examples for 'sea', including 'visitor of the gods', 'husband of Rán', 'father of Ægir's daughters', 'land of Rán and Ægir's daughters'. Kennings cited to skalds in this section include 'the storm-happy daughters of Ægir' meaning 'waves' (Svein) and a kenning in a fragment of a work by the 11th century Icelandic skald Hofgarða-Refr Gestsson, where Rán is referred to as 'Gymir's ... völva':

The section's author comments that the stanza "[implies] that they are all the same, Ægir and Hler and Gymir.

Chapter 33b of Skáldskaparmál discusses why skalds may refer to gold as "Ægir's fire". The section traces the kenning to a narrative surrounding Ægir, in which the jötunn employs "glowing gold" in the center of his hall to light it "like fire" (which the narrator compares to flaming swords in Valhalla). The section explains that "Ran is the name of Ægir's wife, and the names of their nine daughters are as was written above ... Then the Æsir discovered that Ran had a net in which she caught everyone that went to sea ... so this is the story of the origin of gold being called fire or light or brightness of Ægir, Ran or Ægir's daughters, and from such kennings the practice has now developed of calling gold fire of the sea and of all terms for it, since Ægir and Ran's names are also terms for the sea, and hence gold is now called fire of lakes or rivers and of all river-names."

In chapter 61 provides yet more kennings. Among them the author notes that "Ran, who, it is said, was Ægir's wife" and that "the daughters of Ægir and Ran are nine". In chapter 75, Ægir occurs in a list of jötnar.

Saga corpus
In what appears to be a Norwegian genealogical tradition, Ægir is portrayed as one of the three elements among the sea, the fire and the wind. The beginning of the Orkneyinga saga ('Saga of the Orkney Islanders') and Hversu Noregr byggdisk ('How Norway Was Settled') tell that the jötunn king Fornjót had three sons: Hlér ('sea'), whom he called Ægir, a second named Logi ('fire'), and a third called Kári ('wind').

Scholarly reception and interpretation

Banquets
Carolyne Larrington says that Ægir's role in Hymiskviða "may reflect Scandinavian royal practices in which the king enforces his authority on his subordinates by visiting their homes and demanding to be feasted". According to Andy Orchard, Ægir's role in Skáldskaparmál, where he attends a banquet rather than hosting it, could be a deliberate inversion of the traditional motif of Ægir as host.

Gymir
The name Gymir may indicate that Ægir was understood as the father of the beautiful jötunn Gerðr; they may also have been two different figures sharing the same name (see Gymir, father of Gerðr). Both the prose introduction to Lokasenna and Skáldskaparmál state that Ægir is also known as Gymir, the father of the jötunn Gerðr. Rudolf Simek argues that, if understood to be two different entities, this may stem from an erroneous interpretation of kennings in which different jötunn-names are used interchangeably.

Hlér, Læsø, Lejre, and Snow 
As highlighted above in Skáldskaparmál, the name of the island Læsø in Denmark references Hlér (Old Norse Hléysey  'Hlér's Island'). Simek speculates that Hlér may therefore have been seen as something of an ancestor of the island.

Two sources list the personified snow, Snær (Old Norse 'snow'), as Hlér's son. Book nine of Saxo Grammaticus's 12th century history of Denmark Gesta Danorum contains mention of a figure by the name of Lerus (from Old Norse Hlér) whose son is Snio (from Old Norse Snær 'Snow'). The Danish chronicle of Lejre, Chronicon Lethrense also connects the two, and the name Lejre may, like Læsø, derive from the jötunn.

Jötunn
Scholars have often discussed Ægir's role as host to the gods and his description as a jötunn. Anthony Faulkes observes that Ægir is "often described by modern writers as god of the sea" yet that he is nowhere described as a god in the Prose Edda and appears in a list of jötnar in Skáldskaparmál. According to John Lindow, since his wife Rán is listed among the Ásynjur (goddesses) in the same part of the Prose Edda, and since he had a close and friendly relationship with the Æsir (gods), Ægir's description as a jötunn appears questionable. Andy Orchard argues on the contrary that Ægir's inclusion among the Æsir is probably a late development since his daughters are described as jötnar and some sources mention him as the descendant of the jötunn Fornjót. According to Rudolf Simek, while attested as a jötunn, Ægir "has characteristics" of a sea god.

Modern influence

Ægir has been the subject of a variety of art pieces. These include Nils Blommér's painting Näcken och Ägirs döttrar (1850), Johan Peter Molin's (d. 1874) fountain relief Ægir, and Emil Doepler's Ægir (1901).

Ægir is referenced in a variety of others ways in modern popular culture. For example, he is the namesake of a Norwegian corvette produced in 1967 (Ægir), a coastal defense ship in the Imperial German Navy, and of an exoplanet, Epsilon Eridani b.

See also

 Ler (mythology), figure from Irish folklore
 Njörðr, Norse deity associated with the sea
 Trent Aegir, tidal bore on the River Trent

Notes

References

Cleasby, Richard, Guðbrandur Vigfússon (1957). An Icelandic-English Dictionary. 2nd ed. with supplement by William A. Craigie. Clarendon Press. Repr. 1975.

External Links 
 MyNDIR (My Norse Digital Image repository) illustrations of Ægir from Victorian and Edwardian retellings of Norse Mythology. Clicking on the thumbnail will give you the full image and information concerning it.

Jötnar
Deities of wine and beer
Personifications in Norse mythology
Sea and river gods